In the Third Round of CONCACAF, the 12 winners of the Second Round were divided in 3 groups of 4 teams each. Teams in each group would play against each other home-and-away, and the two teams with most points in each group would advance to the Fourth Round.

There were 108 goals scored in 36 matches, for an average of 3 goals per match.

Group 1

Group 2

Group 3

See also 

3
Qual
Q2
Q2
Q2
Q2